La Palma, also known as La isla bonita and officially San Miguel de La Palma, is the most northwesterly island of the Canary Islands, Spain. La Palma has an area of  making it the fifth largest of the eight main Canary Islands. The total population at the end of 2020 was 85,840, of which 15,716 lived in the capital, Santa Cruz de La Palma and about 20,467 in Los Llanos de Aridane.

In 1815, the German geologist Leopold von Buch visited the Canary Islands. It was as a result of his visit to Tenerife, where he visited the Las Cañadas caldera, and then later to La Palma, where he visited the Taburiente caldera, that the Spanish word for cauldron or large cooking pot – "caldera" – was introduced into the geological vocabulary. In the center of the island is the Caldera de Taburiente National Park, one of four national parks in the Canary Islands.

Etymology
The full name of the island is "San Miguel de La Palma" ("Saint Michael of the Palms"), usually abbreviated simply to "La Palma". La Palma is nicknamed "La Isla Bonita" ("beautiful island").

Origins and geology
La Palma, like the other islands of the Canary Islands archipelago, is a volcanic ocean island. This is the site of the Roque de los Muchachos Observatory, one of the world's premier astronomical observatories.

La Palma's geography is a result of the volcanic formation of the island. On its northern side is the exposed remains of the original seamount. Only the deep Barranco de las Angustias ("Ravine of Anxiety") ravine leads into the inner area of the caldera, which is a national park. It can be reached only by hiking. The outer slopes are cut by numerous gorges which run from  down to the sea. Today, only a few of these carry water due to the many water tunnels that have been cut into the island's structure.

From the Caldera de Taburiente to the south runs the ridge Cumbre Nueva ('New Ridge', which despite its name is older than the Cumbre Vieja, 'Old Ridge.') The southern part of La Palma consists of the Cumbre Vieja, a volcanic ridge formed by numerous volcanic cones built of lava and scoria. The Cumbre Vieja ridge is active, last erupting in the 2021 La Palma eruption, which destroyed more than 2600 buildings and caused one death. Beyond Punta de Fuencaliente at the southern tip of the island, the Cumbre Vieja continues in a southerly direction as a submarine volcano.

Volcanism and eruptions

Like all of the Canary Islands, La Palma originally formed as a seamount through submarine volcanic activity. Along with Tenerife, La Palma is the most volcanically active of the Canary Islands. About a half a million years ago, the Taburiente volcano collapsed with a giant landslide, forming the Caldera de Taburiente. Erosion has since exposed part of the old seamount in the northern part of the caldera. Since the Spanish have kept records, there have been eight eruptions – all of which have occurred on the Cumbre Vieja volcanic ridge:
 1470–1492 Montaña Quemada
 1585 Tajuya
 1646 Volcán Martín
 1677 Volcán San Antonio
 1712 El Charco
 1949 Volcán San Juan: Duraznero, Hoyo Negro and Llano del Banco vents
 1971 Volcán Teneguía
 2021 Cumbre Vieja volcanic eruption

At Cumbre Vieja ridge a new monogenetic volcano burst on 19 September 2021 after several seismic crises that rocked the island, among other anomalies regarding volcanic surveillance.

Tsunami scenarios

In an episode of the BBC Horizon series broadcast on 12 October 2000, two geologists hypothesised that during a future eruption, the western flank of Cumbre Vieja, with a mass of approximately 1.5 x1015 kg, could slide into the ocean. The wave could radiate out across the Atlantic and inundate much of the eastern seaboard of North America, and many of the islands in the Caribbean and northern coasts of South America between six and eight hours later. They estimate that such a tsunami could have waves possibly  or higher causing massive devastation along the coastlines. The claim was also explored in a BBC docu-drama called End Day which went through several hypothetical scenarios of disastrous proportions. However, nowhere in their papers do the authors make any claim about the imminent collapse of the flank. Rather, they state that they have modelled the worst-case scenario.

In 2002 the Tsunami Society published a statement stating "... We would like to halt the scaremongering from these unfounded reports..." The major points raised in this report include:
The claim that half of Cumbre Vieja dropped  during the 1949 eruption is erroneous, and contradicted by physical evidence.
No evidence was sought or shown that there is a fault line dividing the island of La Palma.
There has never been a megatsunami in the Atlantic Ocean in recorded history.

A geological survey published in 1999 concluded that the western flank is stable with no evidence of aseismic creep. Other experts agree that the fracture resulting from the 1949 eruption is a shallow and inactive surface expression that should be monitored, but consider the possibility that it is unstable as being almost nonexistent. Also, it is likely that the morphology of the floor of the Atlantic Ocean would hinder the propagation of a transoceanic tsunami. In 2006 Jan Nieuwenhuis of Delft University of Technology simulated several volcanic eruptions and calculated it would take another 10,000 years for the flanks to become sufficiently high and unstable to cause a massive collapse.

A 2008 paper looked into the worst-case scenario of a massive landslide and subsequent megatsunami. The authors concluded that waves could reach heights in the range 10 to 188 meters in the Canary Islands, but that the waves would dissipate as they radiated out into the Atlantic Ocean. They predict 40 meters height for some nearby island systems. For continents, the worst effects would be expected in Northern Brazil (13.6 m), French Guiana (12.7 m), mid-US (9.6 m), Western Sahara (largest prediction at 37 meters) and Mauritania (9.7 m). While still large, this would not qualify as a megatsunami (apart from locally in Macaronesia), with the highest prediction for Western Sahara comparable to the 2011 Japanese tsunami.

Climate
La Palma has a mild and consistent tropical hot semi-arid climate which in the Köppen climate classification is represented as BSh. The winters are warm and the summers are very warm. It has significant influences of the maritime mediterranean climate due to its quite wet winters. For a Canary island, the weather is quite cloudy, as La Palma is far more exposed to marine air systems than easterly islands, caused by the Canary Current. The inland parts of the island have a more humid climate (Köppen: Csa) which leads to very humid, laurisilva cloud forests in the center of the island, such as the Bosque de los Tiles Natural Park.

Government
The island is part of the province of Santa Cruz de Tenerife.

The island is divided into 14 municipalities:

La Palma has a "sister city" relationship with El Dorado Hills, California.

Economy

The local economy is primarily based on agriculture and tourism. Bananas are grown throughout the island with many banana farms on the western side of the island in Los Llanos de Aridane. Other crops include bird of paradise flowers, oranges, avocados and grapes. Local ranchers raise cattle, sheep and goats. Fishermen operating from Santa Cruz de La Palma, Tazacorte, and Puerto Naos catch fish for the local markets.

Flora and fauna

La Palma has abundant plant life, including several endemic species.

Although large areas have been deforested, the upland areas of La Palma retain much of the evergreen laurel forest, where species of Lauraceae, such as Laurus azorica, Persea indica, and Ocotea foetens are a characteristic component. This is a relictual population of the Pliocene subtropical forests which used to cover the island.

The Canary Island pine is found on all of the western Canary Islands, but it is particularly abundant on La Palma. The pine forests are also home to two recently discovered and extremely rare La Palma endemics: Lotus eremiticus and L. pyranthus.

Spartocytisus supranubius, a white-flowered broom known locally as Retama del Teide, is native to La Palma and Tenerife, being restricted to the alpine/subalpine habitats present only in these two islands. Like Tenerife, La Palma also has its own alpine violet, Viola palmensis.

Echium pininana is endemic to La Palma and the tallest species in the genus, reaching over 4 m. It is related to Echium wildpretii which occurs, with separate subspecies, in the subalpine zone of both Tenerife and La Palma. Both species are monocarpic, producing a massive terminal inflorescence. Echium webbii, a branched shrub with several smaller, dark blue flower spikes, is another island endemic with close relatives on Tenerife.

Other La Palma endemics include members of the daisy family, such as Sonchus palmensis, Argyranthemum haouarytheum Pericallis papyracea and Cheirolophus sventenii.

Several animals are native or endemic to La Palma, including the:
 La Palma giant lizard, believed extinct until rediscovered in 2007
 Western Canaries lizard (Gallotia galloti subspecies palmae)
 Graja (Pyrrhocorax pyrrhocorax barbarus), subspecies of the red-billed chough
 Canary Islands chiffchaff (Phylloscopus canariensis)
 La Palma chaffinch (Fringilla coelebs palmae)
 Western Canary Islands goldcrest (Regulus regulus ellenthalerae)
 Garafian Sheepdog Breed (Canis familiaris)
 Canary Islands quail (Coturnix gomerae), now extinct.
 Trias greenfinch (Chloris triasi), now extinct.

In addition, many other animals have been introduced, including rabbits and Barbary sheep, or aoudads, which have become a serious threat to endemic flora

A biosphere reserve was established in 1983, and extended and renamed in 1997 and 2002.

Natural symbols 

The official natural symbols associated with La Palma are the Red-billed chough (Graja) and Pinus canariensis (Canary Island pine).

History
At the time of European colonization, the Canary Islands were inhabited by native Canarians, referred to collectively as Guanches, although the natives of La Palma are more correctly known as Auaritas (See Canary Islands in pre-colonial times). The origin of these natives is unclear but they are believed to share common ancestry with the Berbers of North Africa. The Guanches had a Neolithic culture divided into several clans led by chiefs. Their name for La Palma was Benahoare. The main remnants of this culture are their cave dwellings, enigmatic petroglyphs and paved stone paths through the mountains. After the Spanish occupation of La Palma, the native Canarians vanished by either being killed, sold into slavery or by assimilating into the Spanish population.

It is believed that the Canary Islands were known to the Phoenicians and Greeks, but the earliest written evidence is by the Roman writer Pliny The Elder, who quoted Juba II of Numidia, but Juba's writings were subsequently lost. The Genoese navigator Lancelotto Malocello reached the archipelago in 1312 and remained for two decades until expelled by a native uprising. In 1404 the Spaniards began the conquest of the islands. Though the first landing on La Palma was in 1405, it took until 1493 and several bloody battles until the last resistance of the natives was broken. The conqueror of La Palma was Alonso Fernández de Lugo, who defeated Tanausu, the last king on the island.  He ruled the area known as Acero (Caldera de Taburiente). Tanausu was ambushed after agreeing to a truce arranged by Fernández de Lugo and Juan de Palma, a Guanche who had converted to Christianity and who was a relative of Tanausu.

For the next two centuries, settlements on La Palma became rich as the island served as a trading post on the way to the New World. La Palma received immigrants from Castile, Majorca, Andalusia, Portugal and Catalonia.

Religion

The island is predominately Roman Catholic and since 1676, has been known for the festival of Fiestas Lustrales de la Bajada de la Virgen de las Nieves (the bringing down of the Virgin of the Snow, Virgen de las Nieves), which has a rich history, from the time of the Bishop of the Canaries, Bartolomé García Ximénez. The festival features the dancing of "enanos" or midgets. The costumes that people wear have a hole at the top of the hat to allow them to see out, while giving the appearance of dancing midgets. People come from all over the world for the celebration which happens every five years. The image of the Virgin is taken down from her sanctuary (located in a hilly area on the outskirts of Santa Cruz de La Palma) and paraded around the city of Santa Cruz with the festival lasting nearly two weeks before she is returned. The last time this event was performed in 2015 and the next will be in 2025, as in 2020 had to be cancelled due to the global pandemic of COVID-19.

The Virgin of the Snow is the patron saint of La Palma. Many women on the island have the name "Nieves" in her honor. Every 5 August the annual festival of the Virgin is celebrated.

Transport

All the main roads are asphalted and in a good state, although there are many sharp bends, some very narrow. In order to reach some small hamlets in the north of the island it is necessary to travel on unpaved roads. Several bus routes exist that unite the main settlements on the island.

A road crosses the island from Tazacorte on the west coast to the capital city on the east coast of the island. This road is a two-lane highway that includes a pair of two-lane tunnels. The older tunnel is shorter and higher than the newer tunnel. When traveling from one side of the mountain to the other it is common to enter one side in complete clouds (the east side) and come out to the sunny side (western side). This is due to the clouds not being able to cross the mountains, an effect caused by the counter trade wind.

La Palma Airport is served mainly by Binter Canarias and CanaryFly, and Iberia, with flights to and from Tenerife and Gran Canaria, and also to and from mainland Spain, Germany, United Kingdom, Scandinavia, and the Netherlands.

There is also ferry service between the city of Santa Cruz de La Palma and the islands of Tenerife and Gran Canaria.

Water tunnels
The minas galerias (water tunnels) carry water from sources in the highlands to towns, villages and farms. La Palma receives almost all of its water from the mar de nubes (sea of clouds) of the northeast trade winds. The water condenses on the vegetation, from where it runs into the ground. Eventually it collects inside the rock strata, and is then drained via the galerias into aqueducts and pipes for distribution. The galerias have been cut into the rocks over centuries. It is possible to walk alongside many of the aqueducts, a popular activity for tourists (similar to the levadas of Madeira). The tour to the Marcos y Corderos waterfall and springs is also popular.

There is an extensive network of irrigation canals in the valley of Los Llanos de Aridane. These canals carry water from the mountains throughout the valley and allow for the cultivation of bananas, avocados, flowers, and other plants.

Observatories 

Often, the view from the top of the volcano is a sea of clouds covering the eastern part of the island. Telescopes at the observatory include:
 The Isaac Newton Group of Telescopes (ING) operates three telescopes: the  William Herschel Telescope, the  Isaac Newton Telescope and the  Jacobus Kapteyn Telescope.
 The  Nordic Optical Telescope (NOT).
 The  Swedish 1-m Solar Telescope (SST) operated by the Institute for Solar Physics.
 The  Dutch Open Telescope (DOT), also a solar telescope.
 A  optical telescope.
 The Carlsberg Meridian Telescope (CMT).
 The  Mercator Telescope.
 The  Liverpool Telescope.
 The  Gran Telescopio Canarias (Great Canary Telescope, dedicated 24 July 2009).
 The  Telescopio Nazionale Galileo (TNG).
 The  MAGIC Telescope, an air shower Cherenkov telescope for observing high energy gamma rays
 The SuperWASP-North telescope, used to detect extrasolar planets.

In addition, the Cherenkov Telescope Array is planned for construction starting in 2021.

In 2021 the Visitors Center of Roque de Los Muchachos will be inaugurated.

See also

 List of volcanoes in Spain

References

External links

 Official Tourism Website 
 Official La Palma Website 
 The official website of the Canary Islands
 Comparison images before and after the 2021 eruptions at NASA Earth Observatory
 Stargazing site on La Palma 
 Hiking Network of La Palma official website 
 El Tendal archaeological park 
 

 
Active volcanoes
Biosphere reserves of Spain
Islands of the Canary Islands
Pleistocene volcanism
Pliocene volcanism
Volcanoes of the Canary Islands